Heavy Psych is the fifth studio album by stoner rock band Nebula. It was released in 2009 via Tee Pee Records. Promo copies were released to coincide with a tour that began on August 12, 2008. The album was reissued in 2022 by the band's current label Heavy Psych Sounds Records.

Critical reception 
PopMatters wrote that "Heavy Psych feels both weighted by history and infinitely lighter and spryer than the turgid slop that all too often passes for hard rock these days." The Village Voice called it "basically their familiar, green-fingered grooves filtered through a little Hawkwind cosmic glop." The Chicago Reader wrote: "The inspiration they obviously don't care to waste on their album titles gets channeled instead into period-perfect early-70s lazy-pothead comfy-chair boogie and ecstatic explosions of flanged-out guitar designed to turn your skull inside out through your headphones."

Track listing

Personnel 
Eddie Glass – guitar, vocals, keyboards
Rob Oswald – drums, percussion
Tom Davies – bass, vocals

References

External links 
Nebula's Official Website

Nebula (band) EPs
2009 EPs
Tee Pee Records albums